Philipp Klement (born 9 September 1992) is a German professional footballer who plays as a central midfielder for  club 1. FC Kaiserslautern.

Club career
On 4 August 2014, it was announced that Klement had joined 1. FSV Mainz 05 II on a one-year deal. Both sides can also extend the contract by an agreed clause. In September 2015, he was promoted to the Mainz first team and made his Bundesliga debut as substitute in an away versus Schalke 04. He participated in the first team's training and continued to play for the second team as well.

In the summer of 2019, Klement moved to VfB Stuttgart.

In January 2022 he joined former club SC Paderborn on loan until the end of the 2021–22 season.

On 25 August 2022, Klement returned to 1. FC Kaiserslautern.

References

External links
 
 
 

1992 births
Living people
German footballers
Association football midfielders
Germany youth international footballers
Bundesliga players
2. Bundesliga players
3. Liga players
Regionalliga players
1. FC Kaiserslautern II players
1. FC Nürnberg II players
1. FC Nürnberg players
FC Hansa Rostock players
1. FSV Mainz 05 II players
1. FSV Mainz 05 players
SC Paderborn 07 players
VfB Stuttgart players
VfB Stuttgart II players
1. FC Kaiserslautern players
Sportspeople from Ludwigshafen
Footballers from Rhineland-Palatinate